Quay is a term for a type of wharf, commonly used in Britain and (as can be seen from the specific examples below) in many other places. 

Quay also may refer to:

Literal wharfs 
Boat Quay, a historical quay in Singapore
Clarke Quay, a historical riverside quay in Singapore

Uses of "Quay" or "quay" as metaphor, eponym, etc.

Circular Quay 
Circular Quay (horse), a Kentucky thoroughbred race horse foaled in February 2004
 Sydney, New South Wales, Australia locales:
Circular Quay, a locality in Sydney
Circular Quay ferry wharf, the main cluster of commuter wharves
Circular Quay railway station, a Sydney Trains (q.v.) location

Places named with "Quay" and compass bearings 
North Quay, London, a proposed office development, on the north side of Canary Wharf in London
North Quay, Brisbane, an area of Brisbane, Australia
North Quay 1 & 2 Ferry Wharf, Brisbane, on the Brisbane River in Brisbane, Australia
South Quay DLR station, a Docklands Light Railway station on the Isle of Dogs, in London
West Quay, a shopping centre in Southampton, England

Other proper names referring to "Quay"  
One Raffles Quay, an office building complex located in the CBD of Singapore
Warrington Bank Quay railway station, a mainline railway station serving the UK town of Warrington
Lambton Quay, Wellington, the heart of the CBD of Wellington, New Zealand
Lonsdale Quay, a major transit hub for Vancouver (British Columbia, Canada's) North Shore
Wood Quay, a riverside area of Dublin
Quay (restaurant), a restaurant in Sydney, Australia
Queen's Quay Terminal, in Toronto
 Corus Quay 
 Quayside, Toronto
 Quay (film), a 2015 short documentary film

People
Christopher N'Quay Rosser, American record producer
Jan de Quay (1901-1985), Dutch political figure
Matthew Quay (1833-1904), Pennsylvania senator
Stephen and Timothy Quay, known as the Quay Brothers

Locations
Connah's Quay, the largest town in Flintshire, north Wales
New Quay (disambiguation)
New Quay, a seaside town in Ceredigion, Wales
New Quay, a residential development in Melbourne, Australia 
Newquay, a town and civil parish in Cornwall, England
Quay County, New Mexico, a county located in the U.S. state of New Mexico
Quay, New Mexico, a small town in Quay County
Quay, Oklahoma, a town in Oklahoma, United States

See also
Cay
Key (disambiguation)
River Kwai (disambiguation)